This is the list of the plants in Canada, ordered by family.  This list does not include introduced species, which form a separate list.

Families:
A | B | C | D | E | F | G | H | I J K | L | M | N | O | P Q | R | S | T | U V W | X Y Z

 List of Canadian Heritage Wheat Varieties
 List of Canadian plants by genus
 List of the plants of Canada
 List of the ferns and allies of Canada
 List of the conifers of Canada
 List of the bryophytes of Canada
 List of wildflowers of the Canadian Rocky Mountains

References 

See: Flora of Canada#References

Canadian plants by family
Plants by family